A Group of Danish Artists in Rome is an 1837 oil painting by the Danish Golden Age artist Constantin Hansen. The work depicts a group of Danish painters, architects, and other artists in a Roman hotel room; those painters depicted are Hansen himself, Michael Gottlieb Bindesbøll, Martinus Rørbye, Wilhelm Marstrand, Albert Küchler, Ditlev Blunck, and Jørgen Sonne.

See also
 Template:Constantin Hansen

References

Rxternal links

Paintings by Constantin Hansen
Group portraits by Danish artists
1837 paintings
Paintings in the collection of the National Gallery of Denmark
19th-century paintings in Denmark
Images of Rome
Cultural depictions of Danish men
Cultural depictions of 19th-century painters
Works about artists